Catalan Americans are Americans of Catalan descent. The group is formed by Catalan-born naturalized citizens or residents, their descendants and, to a lesser extent, citizens or residents of Catalan descent who still acknowledge Catalan ancestry.

The Catalan or Catalonian ancestry is identified with the code 204 in the 2000 U.S. Census, with the name Catalonian, which is in the group 200-299 Hispanic categories (including Spain). A total of 1,738 individuals who received the long-form Census questionnaire (which is given to 1 in 6 households) self-identified as Catalan Americans. In the same survey 1,660 people aged 5 or older indicated being able to speak the Catalan language, also with the name Catalonian. Because the long-form samples a sixth of the population, that figure puts the estimate of Catalan speakers in the US in 2000 at around 10,000 people. However, 22,047 people born in Catalonia live in the United States of America.

Catalonians self-identify as White American or Hispanic American. However, in the U.S. Census white (along with black, Asian, and such) is defined as a "racial" category and Hispanic/Latino as an "ethnic" category so it is possible to identify as both.

Notable people

Jacqueline Alemany, journalist and political reporter who serves as congressional correspondent for The Washington Post
Felipe Alfau (1902–1999), novelist and poet
Thaddeus Amat y Brusi (1810–1878), Bishop of Monterey–Los Angeles
Leonardo Balada (born 1933), composer
Ángela Bofill (born 1954), R&B vocalist and songwriter
Francesc Burgos, artist
Nini Camps, folk rock singer–songwriter
Maria Canals-Barrera (born 1966), actress and singer
John Casablancas, founder of Elite Model agency 
Julian Casablancas (born 1978), singer with the rock band The Strokes
Xavier Cugat (1900–1990), bandleader
Pedro de Alberni (1747–1802), governor of Las Californias
Pedro Fages (1734–1794), governor of Las Californias
Ernest Fenollosa (1853–1908), professor of philosophy and political economy
Alex Ferrer (born 1960), judge in the courtroom television show Judge Alex
Danay Ferrer (born 1974)
Fernando Ferrer (born 1950), politician in The Bronx, New York City
Frank Ferrer, American rock drummer and session musician
Jorge Ferrer, author
José Ferrer (1912–1992), actor
Manuel Y. Ferrer, American virtuoso guitarist
Prefuse73, musician
Michelle Font (born 1982), Miss Washington USA 2008
Valentín Fuster (born 1943), cardiologist
Martin Garralaga (1894–1981), film and television actor
Marc Gasol (born 1985), NBA player
Pau Gasol (born 1980), NBA player
Joseph Miró (born 1946), politician
Francisco Mora y Borrell (1827–1905), Bishop of Monterey–Los Angeles
Gaspar de Portolà i Rovira (1716–1784), explorer and governor of California (1767–1770) and founder of San Diego
Manny Puig (born 1954), entertainer
George Rabasa (born 1941), writer
Joseph Sadoc Alemany (1814–1888), Roman Catholic archbishop and missionary
Xavier Sala-i-Martin (born 1962), professor of economics at Columbia University
Josh Segarra (born 1986), actor
Assumpta Serna (born 1957), actress
Oriol Servià (born 1974), race car driver in the IndyCar Series
Carmen Reid, American–Catalonian Spanish teacher and Fulbright scholar

See also
Catalan people

References

External links
 2000 U.S. Census ethnicity
 2000 U.S. Census Languages
 2010 Catalonian census

 
 
European-American society
People of Catalan descent
Spanish American